Ron Meeks (born August 27, 1954) is a former gridiron football player and coach. His son is former Stanford cornerback Quenton Meeks.

Meeks played high school football for the Robert E. Lee Generals in Jacksonville, Florida.  Meeks played college football at Arkansas State University and in the professionally in the Canadian Football League (CFL) with the Hamilton Tiger-Cats, Ottawa Rough Riders and Toronto Argonauts.

Meeks started coaching in the National Football League (NFL) for the Dallas Cowboys in 1991 and coached for the Cincinnati Bengals, Atlanta Falcons, Washington Redskins and St. Louis Rams, before joining the Indianapolis Colts in 2002.  He resigned as the Colts defensive coordinator on January 20, 2009. He was hired as the defensive coordinator for the Carolina Panthers on January 26, 2009. His contract with the Panthers expired after the 2010 season.  He was re-signed as their defensive backs coach on January 17, 2011. On January 24, 2012 Meeks agreed to become the new defensive backs coach of the San Diego Chargers.

References

1954 births
Living people
African-American players of Canadian football
Arkansas State Red Wolves football players
Atlanta Falcons coaches
Carolina Panthers coaches
Cincinnati Bengals coaches
Dallas Cowboys coaches
Hamilton Tiger-Cats players
Indianapolis Colts coaches
Miami Hurricanes football coaches
National Football League defensive coordinators
Ottawa Rough Riders players
San Diego Chargers coaches
Players of American football from Jacksonville, Florida
Robert E. Lee High School (Jacksonville) alumni
St. Louis Rams coaches
Toronto Argonauts players
Washington Redskins coaches
21st-century African-American people
20th-century African-American sportspeople